John Michael Edwards (born March 11, 1991) is an American professional racing driver, and BMW Motorsport works driver.

Career
Edwards began racing cars at the young age of 12 in 2003 in the Skip Barber Series. To the best of his knowledge he became the youngest open wheel racing driver in history, taking his first win at Daytona International Speedway at 12 years and 238 days of age.

In 2005 he went to Europe to compete first in Italian Karting and then after an unexpected early promotion to the world of European motor racing at age 14 he was the youngest to ever hold a FIA racing license racing in Formula Renault 2000 Eurocup and Formula Renault 2.0 Germany. He finished 16th in Eurocup in 2006 and 5th with a win at Anderstorp. In 2007 he returned to the United States and drove in the Atlantic Championship and finished 9th in points for Forsythe Championship Racing with a second at Toronto.

In 2008 he stepped back on the US racing ladder where he won the championship of the Star Mazda Series in spite of missing the first race of the season. He returned to Atlantics for the 2009 season driving for Newman Wachs Racing. He captured 4 wins and 3 poles on his way to the championship. He won the championship over Jonathan Summerton and Simona de Silvestro, 2nd and 3rd in the 2009 Atlantic Championship season.

For 2010, he transitioned to sports cars to join the Mazda factory team and Speed Source, racing in the Rolex Sports Car Series GT class with co-driver Adam Christodoulou. His 2010 highlights included a GT class win in the Grand-Am race at Lime Rock. Also in 2010, driving along co-drivers Michael Auriemma and Michael Edwards, he secured two Nürburgring VLN Class wins for Schubert Motorsports.

For 2011 he joined for Stevenson Motorsports in the Grand-Am Continental GS series. Partnered with Matt Bell, they secured wins at Laguna Seca and Road America. In 2011 he also raced a partial season with Team Sahlen in the Grand-Am GT series, taking the Mazda to the podium several times with co-driver Wayne Nonnamaker.

For 2012 he once again drove with Stevenson Motorsports in both the Grand-Am Continental GS and GT series. At the beginning of the season he suffered an off track anterior cruciate ligament injury and missed the first two races of the season. He returned to achieve 4 pole positions in GT qualifying in the remaining 9 races. After a series of podium finishes in GT he and his teammate Robin Liddell secured victories at Watkins Glen and Lime Rock. He and Matt Bell also had a win at Laguna Seca in the GS series.

In 2013, Edwards returned with Stevenson Motorsports, finishing 3rd in the Rolex Sports Car Series GT class with Robin Liddell and 2nd in the Continental Tire Sports Car Challenge GS class with Matt Bell. In early 2013, John also joined BMW Team Rahal Letterman Lanigan Racing part-time, subbing for Joey Hand in the American Le Mans Series GT class, driving the BMW Z4 GTE. He and Dirk Müller achieved one win among 4 podiums.

For the 2014 season, Edwards was picked up full-time by BMW, teaming with Dirk Müller to finish 7th in the Tudor United SportsCar Championship GTLM class. He also joined Fall-Line Motorsports in the Continental Tire Sports Car Challenge GS class, teaming with Trent Hindman to win the team championship.

Edward returned to BMW Rahal Letterman Lanigan Racing in 2015 and 2016 as a BMW Factory driver in the TUDOR United SportsCar Championship to compete in the GTLM class with co-driver Lucas Luhr. After a strong drive, Edwards and Luhr won at Mazda Raceway Laguna Seca, as well as podium finishes at Canadian Tire Motorsports Park and Petit Le Mans at Road Atlanta. The year 2016 saw tough challenges for the Rahal Letterman Team as the development of the M6 BMW continued with Edwards and teammates securing a solitary podium.

For 2017 Edwards drove for BMW for his 6th year teamed with Martin Tomczyk, a seasoned veteran having raced in DTM for 16 seasons and was the DTM Champion in 2011.  The pair was joined by Kuno Wittmer and Nicky Catsburg for the endurance events. He and Tomczyk won Laguna Seca.2018   

For 2018 John Edwards drove for BMW for his 7th consecutive year teamed with Jesse Krohn and joined by Augusto Farfus and Nicky Catsburg for the endurance events. Highlights were limited to podiums and two poles for Edwards driving the new BMW M8.

For 2019 BMW factory driver John Edwards is once again paired with Jesse  Krohn in the United Sportscar Championship. The pair  will be joined with Alex Zanardi and Colton Herta for the endurance events beginning with the 24 hours of Daytona.  Edwards will also race the 24 hour races at the Nürburgring and Spa-Francorchamps.  Edwards, Nicky Catsburg, and Marco Wittmann began the year with strong start racing for Rowe Racing with a victory at the first VLN at the Nurburgring.

2023 saw Edwards embark upon a customer-focused campaign, pairing ST Racing's Samantha Tan in the Pro-Am class of the 2023 GT World Challenge America. Edwards stated that a number of factors contributed to his decision to join the program, including the sprint race focus of the series. Furthermore, he appreciated the developmental role that he undertook, advising the team as their delegated factory driver.

Motorsports career results

American Open-Wheel Racing Results
(key) (Races in bold indicate pole position) (Races in italics indicate fastest lap)

Atlantic Championship

Star Mazda Championship

Sports car racing results

Continental Tire Sports Car Challenge

Rolex Sports Car Series

American Le Mans Series

Complete WeatherTech SportsCar Championship results
(key) (Races in bold indicate pole position; results in italics indicate fastest lap)

References

External links

Living people
1991 births
Racing drivers from Louisville, Kentucky
24 Hours of Daytona drivers
Rolex Sports Car Series drivers
Atlantic Championship drivers
Indy Pro 2000 Championship drivers
Formula Renault Eurocup drivers
German Formula Renault 2.0 drivers
Formula Renault 2.0 NEC drivers
American Le Mans Series drivers
WeatherTech SportsCar Championship drivers
Nürburgring 24 Hours drivers
BMW M drivers
Forsythe Racing drivers
Newman Wachs Racing drivers
Rahal Letterman Lanigan Racing drivers
Rowe Racing drivers
Motopark Academy drivers
Schnitzer Motorsport drivers
Michelin Pilot Challenge drivers